Prior to its uniform adoption of proportional representation in 1999, the United Kingdom used first-past-the-post for the European elections in England, Scotland and Wales. The European Parliament constituencies used under that system were smaller than the later regional constituencies and only had one Member of the European Parliament each.

The constituency of Hampshire Central was one of them.

It consisted of the Westminster Parliament constituencies (on their 1983 boundaries) of Aldershot, Basingstoke, Eastleigh, North West Hampshire, Southampton Itchen, Southampton Test, and Winchester.

MEPs

Election results

References

External links
 David Boothroyd's United Kingdom Election Results 

European Parliament constituencies in England (1979–1999)
Politics of Hampshire
1984 establishments in England
1994 disestablishments in England
Constituencies established in 1984
Constituencies disestablished in 1994